National Highway 336 (NH 336) is a  National Highway which runs for 52 km completely in the state of Tamil Nadu, India. It is part of the old National Highway 210. The Road splits off from NH-36 at junction on the outskirts of Pudukkottai till Trichy where Keeranur being major town in-between. Many important places exists along the route like Bharathidasan University, Anna University Trichy, Indian Institute of Management Tiruchirappalli, and Trichy Airport.

References

National highways in India
National Highways in Tamil Nadu